Echinolaelaps is a genus of mites in the family Laelapidae.

Species
 Echinolaelaps echidninus (Berlese, 1887)

References

Laelapidae